Fabien Merciris (born 15 May 1977) is a French former cyclist, who specialized in track races. He won a bronze medal in the team pursuit at the 2003 UCI Track Cycling World Championships.

Major results
1998
 1st  Team pursuit – Cali, UCI World Cup
2000
 2nd Team pursuit, National Championships
2001
 2nd Team pursuit, National Championships
2002
 8th Tour de la Somme
2003
 3rd  Team pursuit, UCI World Championships
2004
 1st  Team pursuit – Aguascalientes, UCI World Cup

References

External links

1977 births
Living people
French male cyclists
French track cyclists
Sportspeople from Chartres
Cyclists from Centre-Val de Loire